Walk Into Paradise (also known as Walk Into Hell) is a 1956 French-Australian international co-production adventure film directed by Lee Robinson and Marcello Pagliero and starring Chips Rafferty and Françoise Christophe. It was shot on location in the highlands of Papua New Guinea.

Plot
In New Guinea, Ned "Shark Eye" Kelly floats in town on a raft, suffering from malaria and heat. He has discovered oil in a valley. The local Australian District Officer, Fred, tells Kelly he cannot exploit the oil until the area has been officially "opened up".

In Port Moresby, another District Officer, Steve MacAllister, is about to go on eight months' leave when called in to help on the expedition, as he is the only person who knows the area. MacAllister has to help put in an airstrip so geologists can fly to the territory.

MacAllister has to take along United Nations doctor Louise Dumarcet on the expedition. He is unhappy about this, as it is Louise's first time in the tropics. However when there is a disease outbreak in a town, Louise helps treats some children.

The expedition arrives at a village and meet crocodile hunter Jeff Clayton. Kelley is reluctant to enter a village. He reveals his brother was killed by the locals. They decide to enter anyway. While treating a villager, Louise draws the patient's blood. This is seen by another villager who puts a snake in her bed. The snake bites Louise but she is treated by Jeff, who then kisses her.

The villagers rise up against the expedition and a fight ensues where Kelly is speared to death. However the children Louise was treating recover, ending the battle. The villagers help clear an air strip enabling a plane to land.

Cast
Chips Rafferty as Steve MacAllister
Françoise Christophe as Dr. Louise Dumarcet
Reg Lye as Ned 'Shark-eye' Kelley
Pierre Cressoy as Jeff Clayton
Sergeant Major Somu as Sgt.-Major Towalaka
District Officer Fred Kaad as himself
Capt. Richard Davis as himself

Development
Chips Rafferty and Lee Robinson had produced two earlier films starring Rafferty, The Phantom Stockman and King of the Coral Sea. Their formula was to set the action in an exotic location and for this third movie they chose New Guinea, where Rafferty and Robinson had both served in World War Two.

In May 1954 Rafferty and Robinson returned to Wewa from a location trip up the Sepik River. They announced they planned to film at Kambaramba, a village on the swamp lagoon, at the end of July with a cast and technical crew of 40. It would be the location of their next film. They were so enthused they planned to make several movies in New Guinea.

Filming was delayed. Richard Boone and Chips Rafferty became friends making Kangaroo together. In December 1954 Boone announced he would act in the film, then called The Head Hunters.  Filming on this project was also delayed reportedly due to poor weather.

French involvement
French producer Paul-Edmond Decharme, best known for Manon and Bluebeard, proposed Rafferty and Robinson go into business with the French company Discifilm. The script was rewritten to accommodate two French stars.

In April 1955 Rafferty said the film would be called Walk into Paradise and that Ann Vernon would play the female lead. Later that month Rafferty and Robinson issued a prospectus for investors to put money into the film, offering debentures at £50 each. They claimed The Phantom Stockman had repaid investors 27% and King of the Coral Sea had repaid them 10%.

In May 1955 Decharne announced he would make two films a year in the Pacific. The first two would be co productions with Rafferty and Robinson:, starting withWalk into Paradise, which would be shot on location in New Guinea, in English and French versions. The stars would be Rafferty, Reg Lye, and French players Pierre Cressoy and Francoise Christophe (Vernon having dropped out). Robinson would direct while Marcel Pagliero would be the dialogue director of the French version. The main party of the film unit will leave for New Guinea on 11 June. The voices-of the French stars will be used in both French and English versions. The voices of the Australian stars would be "dubbed" with French dialogue for the French version.

Music for Paradise would be written by Georges Auric, well-known composer of film music and the writer of the title track from Moulin Rouge. The film would cost £150,000 and be financed on a 50/50 basis by Southern International and Decharme's company, Disci Films.

The second film would be made in Tahiti with French director Yves AHegret as the principal director and Robinson as director of the English version. This movie would be shot in Cinema-Scope and would hopefully star Gerard Philippe.

"I was told that the Pacific was very wide, and its capital was Sydney* so I came here," said Decharne."I also heard that Australians appreciated French films better than any other country outside Europe. 'La Ronde' made more money in Australia than it did in France."

Robinson later claimed that 60% of the money invested in the film came from housewives.

The French actors arrived in Australia in June 1955.

Shooting
Shooting began in New Guinea in June 1955 and took place over twelve weeks. The unit was based out of Goroka.

Every scene was shot twice, once in French, once in English: Pagliero would direct the French version, Robinson would do the English.

Robinson got along well with Pagliero calling him "one of the most delightful guys you would ever meet in your life" He says after the first few days of filming both "very quickly realised that you can only have one boss on the floor of the set." They decided that Pagliero would through the scenes with the French actors in the morning and when the Australian actors had to speak French Pagliero would "get all the dialogue done out on idiot boards for them."

Robinson said Pagliero "stood back from the film and worked with his actors a bit, helped the Australian actors with the French dialogue" but contributed more than Robinson originally thought because they would discuss scenes at night.

Robinson said he clashed with the Frenchman only once, during a scene involving the lowering of the Australian flag but "it was a national argument rather than a film argument. But he was terribly aware of the fact that confusion would arise if the two of us were trying to run the set."

 Despite the difficulties of shooting on location, the film was infused only three days behind schedule.

The film was edited in Paris.

Release
The film was released in France as L'Odyssée du Capitaine Steve. A novelisation of the script by Gavin Casey was published in 1956. The film screened at the 1956 Cannes Film Festival. Director Lee Robinson was nominated for the Golden Palm Award but was beaten by Jacques-Yves Cousteau and Louis Malle for Le Monde du silence.

American producer Joseph E. Levine purchased the film for distribution and added more jungle footage.  When the film did poor business he retitled it Walk Into Hell, which increased its earnings dramatically. Robinson claimed at one stage the movie was one of the 100 top grossers in the US.

The Los Angeles Times called it "a fairly pleasant travelogue".

References

External links

Walk Into Paradise at Australian Screen Online
Walk Into Paradise at Oz Movies

1956 films
1950s action adventure films
1950s multilingual films
Australian action adventure films
1950s English-language films
Films directed by Lee Robinson
Films directed by Marcello Pagliero
1950s French-language films
Films set in Papua New Guinea
Films shot in Papua New Guinea
French-Australian culture
French multilingual films
French action adventure films
1950s French films
1950s Australian films